Middleton Township, Ohio may refer to:

Middleton Township, Columbiana County, Ohio
Middleton Township, Wood County, Ohio

See also
Middleton, Ohio (disambiguation)

Ohio township disambiguation pages